Hervey is both an English surname and a masculine given name, probably derived from French Hervé. Notable people with the name include:

Surname:
Lord Alfred Hervey (1816–1875), English politician
Lord Arthur Hervey (1808–1894), English bishop
Arthur Hervey (1855–1922), Irish composer and author
Augustus Hervey, 3rd Earl of Bristol (1724–1779), English admiral and politician
Lord Augustus Hervey (1837–1875), English politician
Lord Charles Hervey (1814–1880), English clergyman and cricketer
Edward Hervey (born 1973), retired Canadian football player
Lord Francis Hervey (1846–1931), English barrister and politician
Frederick Hervey (disambiguation), several people
George Hervey, 2nd Earl of Bristol (1721–1775), English soldier, diplomat and courtier
Geraldine Hervey, Marchioness of Bristol
Herbert Hervey, 5th Marquess of Bristol (1870–1960), English diplomat
Irene Hervey (1909–1998), American actress
Lady Isabella Hervey (born 1982), English socialite, model, and actress
James Hervey (1714–1758), English clergyman and writer
James Hervey (physician) (1751?–1824), English physician and pioneer of smallpox vaccination
Jason Hervey (born 1972), American actor, television producer and public relations agent
John Hervey (disambiguation), several people
Lady Mary Hervey (1700–1768), née Lepell, English courtier
Matt Hervey (born 1966), American ice hockey player
Lord Nicholas Hervey (1961–1998), English aristocrat and monarchist
Robert Hervey (1820–unknown), Scottish-Canadian-American lawyer
Thomas Kibble Hervey (1799–1859), British poet and critic
Victor Hervey, 6th Marquess of Bristol, (1915–1985), English aristocrat, monarchist and businessman
Lady Victoria Hervey (born 1976), English model, socialite and TV personality
Walter Lowrie Hervey (1862–1952), American educator
William Hervey, 1st Baron Hervey (died 1642), English soldier and politician
Sir William Hervey (1586–1660), English politician
Wilna Hervey (1894–1979), American silent film actress and artist
Winifred Hervey (born 1955), American television producer and screenwriter

Given name:
Hervey le Breton (died 1131), Breton cleric
Hervey de Keith (died c.1198), Marischal of Scotland
Hervey de Stanton (1260–1327), English judge
Hervey C. Calkin (1828–1913), American politician
Hervey White (1866–1944), American writer and poet
Hervey Tudway (1888–1914), English cricketer
Hervey Allen (1889–1949), American writer
Hervey Rhodes, Baron Rhodes (1895–1987), English politician
Hervey M. Cleckley (1903–1984), American psychiatrist
Hervey Machen (1916–1994), American politician

See also
Hervey Bay, Queensland, Australia
Hervey Range (mountains), Queensland, Australia
Hervey-Jonction, Quebec, Canada
Hervey Street Road Stone Arch Bridge, New York state, USA
Harvey (disambiguation)
Herve (disambiguation)

English-language surnames
English masculine given names
Surnames from given names